Prosthiostomidae is a family of free-living marine polyclad flatworms in the suborder Cotylea.

Genera 
 Enchiridium Bock, 1913
 Enterogonimus Hallez, 1913
 Euprosthiostomum Bock, 1925
 Lurymare Marcus & Marcus, 1968
 Prosthiostomum Quatrefage, 1845

References

External links 

Turbellaria